The Hyderabad Golf club is an 18-hole golf course located in a historic setting in and around Golconda Fort. A project promoted by the Telangana State Tourism Development Corporation and the Hyderabad Golf Association. Hyderabad's first and only public golf course.

History
Hyderabad Golf club was formed in 1992 with the objective of building a Golf Course to International Standards accessible to civilian residents of the metropolitan area of Hyderabad and its surroundings.

Location
The Hyderabad Golf Club is located just opposite the Qutb Shahi Tombs and shadow of the historic Golconda Fort

Facilities
An 18-hole, 6057 yard, Par 71 golf course, with water bodies and vast greens along with training facilities such as a Golf Academy, Driving Range, and a club house.

Controversies 
In 2010, the Hyderabad Golf Club set up an illegal golf course within the premises of the historic Naya Qila, which has resulted in outrage among heritage activists. Against ASI rules, the golf course restricted tourists' entry to the fort. As of 2019, the course is still active.

References

Golf clubs and courses in India
Sport in Hyderabad, India
Sport in Telangana
Sports venues in Telangana
1992 establishments in Andhra Pradesh
Sports venues completed in 1992
20th-century architecture in India